HMS Wild Boar was a brig-sloop launched in 1808. She was wrecked in 1810.

Career
Captain Thomas Burton commissioned Wild Boar in October 1808.

On 12 April 1809, Wild Boar captured Verite.

On 13 May Burton sailed Wild Boar for Portugal.

Lloyd's List reported on 23 May that Wildboar had detained and sent into Falmouth Gustaff, Trent, master, which had been sailing from Bordeaux.

While Wild Boar was on the Lisbon station she captured a French schooner carrying some staff officers from Ferrol to Bayonne. She returned from the Tagus to land at Falmouth an army officer with dispatches.

Fate
Commander Villiers Francis Hatton was appointed to Wild Boar at the beginning of 1810 but before he could take command she was wrecked on 15 February on the Runnel Stone, Isles of Scilly. Lloyd's List reported on 20 February that Wildboar had left Falmouth on the 15th with dispatches for Lisbon.

The courtmartial of Burton and his crew took place on 23 March. It found that Wild Boar had been sailing from Falmouth to Cork and was passing between Scilly and the mainland when she struck in fine weather on the Runnelstone. She took on water so quickly most of the crew had to jump into the sea.

Earl of Uxbridge fortuitously and fortunately was in sight and came to Wild Boars rescue. Even so, 12 men drowned.

The court martial exonerated Burton and blamed the loss on the incompetence of the master. It also described the master's behaviour as reprehensible; when she struck he had jumped into the jolly boat and made off. The court martial ordered him dis-rated, to serve only as a seaman.

Captain Burton went on to commission the new sloop .

Notes, citations, and references
Notes

Citations

References
 
 
 

1808 ships
Cherokee-class brig-sloops
Maritime incidents in 1810
Shipwrecks of the Isles of Scilly